California State University, San Bernardino (Cal State San Bernardino or CSUSB) is a public research university in San Bernardino, California. Founded in 1965, it is part of the California State University system. Cal State San Bernardino's fall 2020 enrollment was 19,404. In fall 2018, it had 310 full-time faculty, of which 220 (71 percent) were on the tenure track.

The university is classified among "R2: Doctoral Universities – High research activity", offering bachelor's degrees in 123 programs, master's degrees in 61 programs, two Doctor of Education (Ed.D.) programs (Community College specialization and K–12 specialization), and 23 teaching credentials.

CSUSB's sports teams are known as the Coyotes and play in the California Collegiate Athletic Association in the Division II of the National Collegiate Athletic Association. The nickname was inspired by the coyotes that inhabit the area around the campus, which lies in the foothills of the San Bernardino Mountains. The CSUSB women's volleyball team has won thirteen CCAA titles, eight West Region titles and a national title. The men's soccer team went to the NCAA Division II national semi-finals, capturing the university's first California Collegiate Athletic Association title. The university is a Hispanic-serving institution.

History
California State University, San Bernardino was created by the state legislature on April 29, 1960, as the San Bernardino-Riverside State College. Later, the California State College system's board of trustees chose a  site in the city of San Bernardino. In 1963 and the college's official name was changed to California State College at San Bernardino. It opened in 1965 with 293 students and 30 faculty members. CSUSB earned its university status in 1984, officially becoming California State University, San Bernardino. Today, the university has more than 18,000 students and 84,000 alumni.

Campus

Built atop  of bedrock on the city's north side, CSUSB is framed to the north by the San Bernardino Mountains.
Campus residential housing provides more than 1,500 beds.

A new College of Education building opened in 2008. The Santos Manuel Student Union has doubled in size in recent years, and a new  Student Recreation and Fitness Center was completed in 2007. Other recently constructed facilities include the Social and Behavioral Sciences and Chemical Sciences buildings.

The John M. Pfau Library, named after the university's first president, sits at the very center of the campus. Other distinctive university landmarks include: the clock tower above the Santos Manuel Student Union, the Robert V. Fullerton Art Museum, and the James & Aerianthi Coussoulis Arena, a modern, 4,000-plus seat sports and events venue—one of the largest indoor arenas in the Inland Empire.

In 2009, the university received a major donation from the Pauline Murillo family to construct a $2 million research observatory on the campus. The W.M. Keck Foundation and the California Portland Cement Co. also made substantial contributions. The university is a Hispanic-serving institution.

Robert and Frances Fullerton Museum of Art
The Robert and Frances Fullerton Museum of Art (formerly the Robert V. Fullerton Art Museum) is among the 4 percent of museums in the United States accredited by the American Alliance of Museums. The RAFFMA's permanent collections consist of three distinct kinds of art: ancient, ceramic, and contemporary. A world-class collection of about 200 Egyptian artifacts and a smaller selection of Italian pottery are part of the museum's permanent holdings. Rotating shows feature artists from throughout the region and country. One gallery of the museum is dedicated to exhibiting the work of the school's own art students. The museum celebrated its 20th anniversary in 2016 and received accreditation by the American Alliance of Museums in 2008.

Palm Desert Campus

Opened in 1986, the California State University, San Bernardino Palm Desert Campus in Palm Desert, California hosts upper-division and graduate students. Many of them come from the Coachella Valley and Joshua Tree areas. Since its inception, the Palm Desert Campus has maintained a close relationship with the nearby College of the Desert. The majority of Palm Desert Campus undergraduate students have transferred from College of the Desert through a dual admissions program.

A health sciences building for the four-year nursing program opened on the Palm Desert Campus in October 2008.

The Palm Desert Campus was built entirely with private funds. This public-private partnership was featured in a front-page story in the Sunday, August 3, 2003, edition of the New York Times.

Murillo Family Observatory
The Murillo Family Observatory is a teaching and research observatory at CSUSB, located on Badger Hill on the northern portion of campus. It is the newest research observatory in the Inland Empire and in the California State University system. The observatory consists of two telescopes which are used for research and teaching; a 20-inch Ritchey-Chretien and a 17-inch Corrected Dall-Kirkham Astrograph. In addition to the research telescopes the observatory has an observation deck with piers where small telescopes may be set up for undergraduate laboratory classes or open house nights. It serves as both an academic and community resource, with public viewing nights and special astronomy events for the community.

Organization and administration

San Bernardino-Riverside State College became a part of the California College System (now called the California State University system) in 1965 and eventually became California State University, San Bernardino. It, along with 22 other campuses, now forms the California State University system, which is the largest senior system of higher education in the United States.

The current president is Tomas Morales, who was chosen in 2013. A graduate of SUNY New Paltz, he serves on the boards of directors of the American Council on Education, and the American Association of State Colleges and Universities, for which he is chair.

Academics
Fall Freshman Statisticshttp://irdata.csusb.edu 

The university offers degree, credential, and certificate programs. It is divided into three Liberal Arts colleges,
College of Arts and Letters
College of Natural Sciences
College of Social and Behavioral Sciences

and three vocational colleges:
Jack H. Brown College of Business and Public Administration
College of Education
College of Extended Learning

Cal State San Bernardino has taken a role in furthering the study and understanding Middle Eastern Cultures, and is the only CSU campus offering Arabic language and Islamic history courses. CSUSB's University Center for Developmental Disabilities is a clinical training program that provides evaluation, assessment, training, and support for autistic children, their parents, and siblings.  CSUSB also offers a burgeoning program in Egyptology, with a Certificate in Egyptology offered through the Department of History and the opportunity to learn about Ancient Egypt at the Robert and Frances Fullerton Museum of Art RAFFMA that houses one of the largest collections of ancient Egyptian objects on the West Coast.

Popular majors for undergraduates in 2018 included Business Administration (Management and Operations) at 23.01%, Psychology (General) at 14.31%, Criminal Justice and Corrections at 6.40%. For graduates, popular majors included Business Administration, Management and Operations at 17.47%, Social Work at 14.21%, Education (General) at 10.82%.

The five most popular majors for 2019 graduates.
 Business, Management, Marketing, and Related Support Services at 25%
 Psychology at 14%
 Social Sciences at 10%
 Health Professions and Related Programs at 7%
 Homeland Security, Law Enforcement, Firefighting and Related Protective Services at 6%

Business and National Security Studies

Many CSUSB programs have earned specialized national and international accreditation, including the business program, which was the first in the Inland Empire to gain AACSB Accreditation at both the graduate and undergraduate levels. AACSB Accreditation represents the highest standard of achievement for business schools worldwide. Less than 5% of the world's 13,000 business programs have earned AACSB Accreditation. AACSB-accredited schools produce graduates that are highly skilled and more desirable to employers than other non-accredited schools. The business and entrepreneurship programs are nationally recognized, as evidenced by CSUSB's 2006 ranking of fourth in the United States for graduate entrepreneur programs. The university's College of Business and Public Administration was also listed in the 2008 edition and the 2013 edition of The Princeton Review's "Best 290 Business Schools.". In 2011, California State University, San Bernardino's Jack H. Brown College of Business and Public Administration was recognized by European CEO Magazine as one of the top 20 schools of business in the world and one of the world's 18 most innovative business schools.

The National Security Studies master of arts program is a nationally renown, two-year program that offers a comprehensive curriculum for students interested in pursuing careers in national service. It is one of three such programs in the country and the only one in the California State University system. The university also has collaborative educational programs with nearby Fort Irwin.
In addition, CSUSB's advanced accounting students provide free tax preparation services to local low-income, elderly, disabled, non-English-speaking residents.

Jack Brown Hall
Many business and public administration classes take place in Jack Brown Hall, which was funded by Jack Brown, chairman of the board and chief executive officer of Stater Bros., and opened on September 23, 1991. Jack Brown pledged $1 million to building enhancements in 1992, which was the largest donation CSUSB had ever received at the time; as a result, CSUSB named the building after him. He also provided student scholarships.

Education
The university is one of the region's largest teacher-training institutions. In 2007, the university welcomed its first class of doctoral degree candidates. The Ed.D. in educational leadership is a research-based program that prepares pre-K through 12 and community college leaders to contribute to the study, development and implementation of educational reforms.

Admissions, enrollment and retention

Admission to CSUSB is based on a combination of the applicant's high school cumulative grade point average (GPA) and standardized test scores. These factors are used to determine the applicant's California State University (CSU) eligibility index. More specifically, the eligibility index is a weighted combination of high school grade point average during the final three years of high school and a score on either the SAT or ACT. The average grade point average for incoming freshmen is 3.34. The average composite ACT score was 20 and the average SAT score was 900. Overall, 58.2% of applicants are accepted to CSUSB.
Enrollment has increased by more than a third in recent years, and freshman enrollment has doubled. Due to the large number of applicants in the fall 2010 quarter, CSUSB has declared "campus impaction" for the first time in its history. More than 70 percent of CSUSB students are the first generation of their families to attend college. Latino and African American student enrollments are the third highest of any university in California. CSUSB students are awarded on average 13 percent of CSU system scholarships, despite representing only 4 percent of the CSU's overall enrollment. Fifty-seven percent of full-time undergraduate students at CSUSB receive sufficient scholarships and grants to pay all fees and another 10 percent pay less than the full fees. Almost 75 percent of CSUSB students receive financial aid. More than three-quarters of the incoming 2009 freshmen class required remediation in either English or Math or both.

President's Academic Excellence Scholarship program
Initiated in 2002 by university president, Albert K. Karnig, the President's Academic Excellence Scholarship program invites the top 1 percent of graduating high school seniors in San Bernardino County to attend Cal State San Bernardino. The program provides a full scholarship, including tuition, books and a small stipend, to eligible students and is renewable for up to four academic years. The program is designed to attract the best and brightest students to CSUSB who might otherwise be lured to colleges outside the area. , there were 132 enrolled presidential scholars. The first major donor to this program was Evelyn Magnuson, who extended her legacy in 2008 through a planned gift making CSUSB a beneficiary of her $2.4 million estate.

Rankings

CEO Magazine ranked Cal State San Bernardino Tier One Top Global MBA Program and Best Value Schools ranked 1 Cal State San Bernardino on Best Online Criminal Justice Degree Program.

Money ranked Cal State San Bernardino 70th in the country out of the 744 schools it evaluated for its 2019–20 Best Value Colleges ranking.

Washington Monthly ranked Cal State San Bernardino 3rd in 2020 among 614 master's universities in the U.S. based on its contribution to the public good, as measured by social mobility, research, and promoting public service.

The Daily Beast ranked Cal State San Bernardino 115th in the country out of the nearly 2000 schools it evaluated for its 2013 Best Colleges ranking.

CSUSB Jack H. Brown College of Business and Public Administration ranks as one of the top 20 schools of business in the world and one of the world's 18 most innovative business schools.

The Princeton Review 2013 Edition also ranks CSUSB Jack H. Brown College of Business as one of the top 296 "Best Business Schools" in 2013 worldwide.

Student life

Like many other universities, much of the student life on campus revolves around extensive local outreach and retention programs.  As of fall 2018 CSU Sand Bernardino has the largest enrollment percentage of Mexican Americans in the California State University system. CSUSB also has a very diverse campus of different ethnicities and nationalities. CSUSB is home to more than 100 student clubs and organizations, including academic, cultural, religious, service and political organizations.

Student newspaper

The Coyote Chronicle is the student newspaper published in the Broadsheet format.  When classes are in session, it publishes every Monday throughout the school year. The current executive editor is Richard Bowie.  The paper is a forum for student expression and is written, edited, and managed by university students. It is overseen by the Department of Communication, which sets policies for the Coyote Chronicle and other campus communications media.

Student residence halls
Cal State San Bernardino's residence halls, which are referred to as "The Villages," consist of three structures—Serrano Village, Arrowhead Village, and the University Village—which houses more than 1,500 students in single and double rooms.

Student organizations, and activities
Student media organizations include the Coyote Chronicle, the student newspaper that is a part of the college media network, and Coyote Radio, a popular station for music, local news, talk and campus information. It is also one of only 50 college stations around the world listed as an official iTunes college station, and finished third in the MTVU Woodie Awards for best college radio station. Coyote Radio recently became the home and partner to Isla Earth, the award-winning radio science program.

The Coussoulis Arena is a popular site for concerts, entertainment activities, commencement ceremonies and also serves kinesiology students.

Greek organizations
With the support of alumni and University advisors, CSUSB has seen the establishment of 15 social fraternity and sorority chapters managed by Student Leadership and Development.  At least eight or more fraternities are co-ed and are either major related, honor related, or community service related.

CSUSB Greek Chapters Include:

Alpha Delta Pi
Alpha Kappa Alpha
Alpha Kappa Psi
Alpha Phi
Delta Sigma Chi
Delta Sigma Phi
Delta Sigma Theta
Gamma Zeta Alpha
Iota Phi Theta
Kappa Delta
Kappa Delta Chi
Kappa Sigma
Lambda Theta Alpha
Lambda Theta Nu
Lambda Theta Phi
Pi Kappa Alpha
Sigma Lambda Beta
Sigma Lambda Gamma
Sigma Nu
Sigma Phi Epsilon
Sigma Pi Alpha
Zeta Tau Alpha
Zeta Phi Beta

Athletics

In 2009, CSUSB intercollegiate athletics celebrated its 25th anniversary. Established in 1984, the program offers men's and women's soccer and basketball, men's golf and baseball and women's softball, cross country, volleyball and track & field along with the Coyotes Spirit Squad. The school's athletic mascot is the Coyote and the school colors are blue (Pantone 300) and black.

The Coyotes play in the California Collegiate Athletic Association (CCAA) in the NCAA's Division II. The men's and women's basketball and women's volleyball teams play in the James & Aerianthi Coussoulis Arena, and the baseball team plays at Fiscalini Field in Perris Hill Park.

Since 1984, the Coyotes have taken many local and regional championships and regularly finish high up in national tournaments. The men's soccer team went to the NCAA Division III national semi-finals in 1987 and captured the university's first NCAA Division II California Collegiate Athletic Association title in 1991. In 1997, Scott Householder grabbed the university's sole national championship to date with a 273 for 72 holes, a record that still stands. Men's golf has finished third in the national tournament three times in its history.

The men's baseball team took West Region titles in 1990 and 1991. The men's basketball team has won three West Region titles, eight CCAA championships, and has made one appearance in the NCAA Division II national semi-finals.

The CSUSB women's volleyball team has won 15 CCAA and 8 West Region titles, has gone to the NCAA Division II quarter finals in 2017, semi-finals in 2003, in 2008, when it advanced to the finals, and three times, 2009, 2011 and 2019 when it won the final. Besides both being located in the east of California, but one in the south and the other in the north, San Bernardino and Stanisaus have competed heavily as conference rivals.

Notable alumni

There are currently more than 84,000 alumni members in all 50 states and in over 35 countries. Among the notable alumni of CSUSB have become prominent businessmen, engineers, athletes, actors, politicians, and those that have gained both national and international fame. To keep alumni connected, the CSUSB alumni association has established over several regional alumni groups.  CSUSB alumni have served in the White House, California Legislature, and United States Congress.

Some of the more notable alumni include:

Politics and government

 Anthony Adams, B.A. political science 1999 – California State Assemblyman, 59th district
 John J. Benoit, M.P.A. 1993 – California State Senate, 37th district
 Wilmer Carter, B.A. English 1972, M.A. education 1976 – California State Assemblymember, 62nd district since 2002
 Paul Cook, M.P.A. 1996 – Congressman serving California's 8th district; California State Assemblyman, 65th district 2006–2012
 Pedro Nava, B.A. sociology 1993 – California State Assemblyman, 35th district
 Joe Baca Jr., B.A. M.A. member of the California State Assembly from the 62nd District from 2004 until 2006.

Military
 Paul Chabot Lieutenant Commander of Naval Intelligence with the United States Navy Reserve.
 Sandra Finan, B.A. 1978 – U.S. Air Force Brigadier General
 Robert Eatinger – United States Navy, National Security Agency, and CIA lawyer

Business

 Ahmed Sultan Bin Sulayem, B.A. 2000 – Executive Chairman of the Dubai Multi Commodities Centre, Dubai, United Arab Emirates
 Isabel Quintero B.A. in English; M.A. in English Composition

Athletics
 Jimmy Alapag – Member of Philippine National Basketball Team and former professional basketball player. Current head coach of Tanduay Alab Pilipinas in the ASEAN Basketball League
 Ernest Chavez – Professional mixed martial artist, current UFC Lightweight
 James Cotton – former professional basketball player in the NBA
 Abdi Faras – player for Somalia's national basketball team 
 Alida Gray – Judoka and professional MMA fighter
 Ivan Johnson, 2006–2007 – Professional basketball player who played for the NBA's Atlanta Hawks from 2011 to 2013.

Entertainers
 Sharon Jordan, M.A. 1986 – actress, The Suite Life of Zack & Cody and That's So Suite Life of Hannah Montana

See also
 California Master Plan for Higher Education

Notes

References

External links

CSUSB Athletics website

 
San Bernardino
California State University, San Bernardino
Schools accredited by the Western Association of Schools and Colleges
Educational institutions established in 1965
Education in San Bernardino, California
Universities and colleges in San Bernardino County, California
1965 establishments in California
College radio stations in California
Radio stations in California